National Secondary Route 161, or just Route 161 (or ) is a National Road Route of Costa Rica, located in the Guanacaste province.

Description
In Guanacaste province the route covers Nandayure canton (Carmona, Santa Rita districts).

References

Highways in Costa Rica